In the United States, the National Archives facilities are facilities and buildings housing the research and agency services of the country's National Archives and Records Administration.  Within the organization of the National Archives, the upkeep of its facilities falls under the National Archives Facilities and Property Management Office.

National Archives Building 

The National Archives Building, known informally as Archives I, located north of the National Mall on Constitution Avenue in Washington, D.C., opened as its original headquarters in 1935. It holds the original copies of the three main formative documents of the United States and its government: the Declaration of Independence, the Constitution, and the Bill of Rights.  It also hosts a copy of the 1297 Magna Carta confirmed by Edward I. These are displayed to the public in the main chamber of the National Archives, which is called the Rotunda for the Charters of Freedom. The National Archives Building also exhibits other important American historical documents such as the Louisiana Purchase Treaty, the Emancipation Proclamation, and collections of photography and other historically and culturally significant American artifacts.

Once inside the Rotunda for the Charters of Freedom, there are no lines to see the individual documents and visitors are allowed to walk from document to document as they wish. For over 30 years the National Archives have forbidden flash photography but the advent of cameras with automatic flashes have made the rules increasingly difficult to enforce.  As a result, all filming, photographing, and videotaping by the public in the exhibition areas has been prohibited since February 25, 2010.

An Innovation Hub provides facilities for the public to access NARA documents and provide metadata. Historical records of the U.S. House of Representatives and the U.S. Senate are available for research at NARA's Center for Legislative Archives.

National Archives at College Park

Because of space constraints, NARA opened a second facility, known informally as "Archives II", in 1994 near the University of Maryland, College Park campus (8601 Adelphi Road, College Park, MD, 20740-6001). Largely because of this proximity, NARA and the University of Maryland engage in cooperative initiatives. The College Park campus includes an archaeological site that was listed on the National Register of Historic Places in 1996.

Washington National Records Center

The Washington National Records Center (WNRC), located in Suitland, Maryland is a large warehouse type facility which stores federal records which are still under the control of the creating agency.  Federal government agencies pay a yearly fee for storage at the facility.  In accordance with federal records schedules, documents at WNRC are transferred to the legal custody of the National Archives after a certain point (this usually involves a relocation of the records to College Park).  Temporary records at WNRC are either retained for a fee or destroyed after retention times has elapsed.  WNRC also offers research services and maintains a small research room.

National Personnel Records Center

Two offices in the St. Louis, Missouri area comprise the National Personnel Records Center.
 Spanish Lake, Missouri, Military Personnel Records Center
 Valmeyer, Illinois, Civilian Personnel Records Center,

Regional facilities

There are facilities across the country with research rooms, archival holdings, and microfilms of documents of federal agencies and courts pertinent to each region.
 Atlanta, Georgia, located in Morrow, Georgia
 Boston, Massachusetts, NARA at Boston is located in Waltham, Massachusetts
 Chicago, Illinois
 Denver, Colorado, NARA at Denver is located in Broomfield, Colorado
 Fort Worth, Texas
 Kansas City, Missouri
 New York City, New York
 Philadelphia, Pennsylvania
 Riverside, California
 San Francisco, California
 Seattle, Washington (National Archives at Seattle)

A regional office in Anchorage, Alaska was closed in 2014 with records for the region transferred to Seattle, Washington. The Seattle facility was planned to be closed by a decision of the U.S. Office of Management and Budget in January 2020, with records moved to California and Kansas City, but the decision was later revised by the Biden administration.

Federal Records Centers

Federal Records Centers exist in each region that house materials owned by federal government agencies. Federal Records Centers are not open for public research but, in many cases, may be housed in the same complex or building as a National Archives regional office.  The federal records centers (FRCs) are also administratively divided into two archival divisions.

Division East

 Atlanta FRC
 Boston FRC
 Chicago FRC
 Dayton FRC
 Dayton Kingsridge FRC
 Fort Worth FRC
 Philadelphia FRC
 Pittsfield FRC

Division West

 Kansas City FRC
 Lee's Summit FRC
 Riverside FRC
 San Bruno FRC
 Seattle FRC

The Director of the Federal Records Center Program is considered one of the primary office chiefs in the National Archives Executive for Agency Services.  The federal records center program is headquartered at the National Archives at College Park.  Both the National Personnel Records Center (NPRC) and the Washington National Records Center (WNRC) are considered part of the federal records center program.

Lenexa Federal Records Center

The Federal Records Center in Lenexa, Kansas is a large underground complex which contains storage vaults for records and artifacts.

Presidential libraries

NARA also maintains the Presidential Library system, a nationwide network of libraries for preserving and making available the documents of U.S. presidents since Herbert Hoover. The Presidential Libraries include:
 Herbert Hoover Presidential Library in West Branch, Iowa
 Franklin D. Roosevelt Presidential Library in Hyde Park, New York
 Harry S. Truman Presidential Library in Independence, Missouri
 Dwight D. Eisenhower Presidential Library in Abilene, Kansas
 John F. Kennedy Presidential Library in Boston, Massachusetts
 Lyndon B. Johnson Presidential Library in Austin, Texas
 Richard Nixon Presidential Library and Museum in Yorba Linda, California
 Gerald R. Ford Presidential Library in Ann Arbor, Michigan
 Gerald R. Ford Presidential Museum in Grand Rapids, Michigan
 Jimmy Carter Presidential Library in Atlanta, Georgia
 Ronald Reagan Presidential Library in Simi Valley, California
 George Bush Presidential Library in College Station, Texas
 William J. Clinton Presidential Library in Little Rock, Arkansas
 George W. Bush Presidential Library in University Park, Texas

Libraries and museums have been established for other presidents, but they are not part of the NARA presidential library system, and are operated by private foundations, historical societies, or state governments, including the Abraham Lincoln, Rutherford B. Hayes, William McKinley, Woodrow Wilson and Calvin Coolidge libraries. For example, the Abraham Lincoln Presidential Library and Museum is owned and operated by the state of Illinois.

Affiliated facilities
The National Archives Building in downtown Washington holds record collections such as all existing federal census records, ships' passenger lists, military unit records from the American Revolution to the Philippine–American War, records of the Confederate government, the Freedmen's Bureau records, and pension and land records.

There are also ten Affiliated Archives locations across the U.S. which hold, by formal, written agreement with NARA, accessioned records.
 Oklahoma Historical Society, Oklahoma City, Oklahoma
 Pennsylvania State Archives, Bureau of Archives and History, Harrisburg, Pennsylvania
 Prints and Photographs Division, Library of Congress, Washington, D.C.
 State Records Center and Archives, Santa Fe, New Mexico
 U.S. Government Printing Office, Washington, D.C.
 U.S. Military Academy Archives, West Point, New York
 University of North Texas Libraries, Denton, Texas
 William W. Jeffries Memorial Archives, U.S. Naval Academy, Annapolis, Maryland
 Yellowstone National Park Archives, Wyoming

Beginning in 2012, the National Archives began storing closed (classified and privacy protected) records not open to the public, as well as certain lesser used records and files, at contracted storage facilities operated by the records management company "Iron Mountain".

See also
 Founders Online

References

National Archives and Records Administration
Lists of government buildings in the United States